Elisabet Barnes (born April 13, 1977, née Frankenberg) is a Swedish athlete specialized in ultrarunning.
Her major claim to fame is winning the Marathon des Sables in 2015, winning each stage of the race.
She repeated her win in 2017. The Marathon des Sables has been listed by Outside Magazine as one of the 9 toughest ultramarathons in the world.
In 2015, she participated in six races, winning all and setting new course records in four.

Barnes grew up in Sweden but moved to England in 2007 where she started to run ultra trails in 2011.
She holds an MSc in Engineering & Business Management and a Graduate Certificate in Change Management, and has a professional background in management consulting.
Barnes co-owns a shop that specializes in running equipment.
Her partner, Norwegian Sondre Amdahl, is a professional mountain ultra trail-runner and endurance coach.

Results

2011
 4th Lidingö Ultra , Sweden
 1st 50 Mile Challenge , UK
 5th Norfolk Coastal Ultra , UK

2012
 15th Marathon des Sables , 6 stages, Morocco
 1st Ring O’ Fire , 3 stages, UK
 2nd Norfolk Coastal Ultra , UK

2013
 9th Centurion South Downs Way , UK

2014
 5th North Downs Way 100 Mile Race , UK
 2nd 10 Peaks Brecon Beacons , UK
 9th Grand Union Canal Race , UK

2015
 1st Go Beyond Ultra Country to Capital , UK (new course record)
 1st Pilgrim Challenge North Downs Way Multistage Ultra , 2 stages, UK  (new course record)
 1st Marathon des Sables , 6 stages, Morocco
 1st Trail Menorca Costa Sud (TMCS) , Spain (new course record)
 1st 10 Peaks Brecon Beacons , UK (new course record)
 1st Oman Desert Marathon , 6 stages, Oman

2016
 2nd The Coastal Challenge Costa Rica , 6 stages, Costa Rica
 4th Marathon des Sables , 6 stages, Morocco
 3rd Richtersveld Transfrontier Wildrun , 6 stages, South Africa/Namibia
 1st The Big Red Run , 6 stages, Australia (1st overall)
 2nd Grand to Grand Ultra , 6 stages, USA

2017
 4th The Coastal Challenge Costa Rica , 6 stages, Costa Rica
 1st Marathon des Sables , 6 stages, Morocco (11th overall)
 4th TransRockies Run , 6 stages, USA
 3rd Everest Trail Race , 6 stages, Nepal

2018
 1st Ultra Mirage El Djerid , Tunisia (4th overall)

2019
1st Trans Atlas Marathon , 6 stages, Morocco (3rd overall)

References

Notes

External links
 
 Elisabet Barnes' profile at Power of 10
 Elisabet Barnes' profile at Ultra Signup
 Elisabet Frankenberg's profile at Ultra Signup
 Elisabet Barnes' profile at DUV
 Elisabet Barnes' profile at ITRA

1977 births
Living people
Swedish ultramarathon runners
Swedish female long-distance runners
Female ultramarathon runners